The 2008–09 WHL season was the 43rd season of the Western Hockey League (WHL). The regular season began on September 18, 2008, and ended on March 15, 2009. The WHL Playoffs commenced on March 20, 2009, and the 2008 ADT Canada Russia Challenge series, featuring Team WHL versus the Russian Selects, took place from November 26–27, 2008. The Kelowna Rockets won the Ed Chynoweth Cup as WHL champions.

WHL Commissioner, Ron Robison, dedicated the 2008–09 season to Ed Chynoweth.

2008–09: Ed Chynoweth's season 

The Commissioner of the Western Hockey League, Ron Robison, dedicated the 2008–09 season to Ed Chynoweth, who died on April 22, 2008. His death occurred just over a year after the WHL Championship trophy was changed in his honour. Ed Chynoweth was the principle builder of Major Junior hockey in Canada as President of the WHL and CHL over the past four decades. Throughout the entire 2008–09 season, the helmets of all the players and officials will display an "EC" decal, representing Ed's initials.

Notable dates 
 Offseason
 June 17, 2008 — former WHL Commissioner, Ed Chynoweth, was elected to the Hockey Hall of Fame.
 June 20–21, 2008 — 37 WHL players were selected in the 2008 NHL Entry Draft.
 June 24, 2008 — 16 WHL players were invited to the National Men's Under-18 Selection Camp.
 June 25, 2008 — 17 WHL players were invited to the Hockey Canada's National Junior Team Development Camp.
 June 26, 2008 — the WHL entered into a partnership with Hockey Manitoba, providing additional financial support for their hockey system.
 July 7, 2008 — Saskatoon and Regina, Saskatchewan were chosen as hosts to the 2010 IIHF World Junior Championship.
 July 10, 2008 — the WHL and INSINC extended their WHL WEB TV partnership.
 July 23, 2008 — 18 WHL players attended Canada's National Junior Team Development Camp in Ottawa, Ontario.
 July 30, 2008 — longtime Brandon Wheat Kings athletic trainer, Rob "Stofe" Stouffer, died of liver cancer.
 August 5, 2008 — 10 WHL players were named to Canada's Under-18 Summer Team at the 2008 Memorial of Ivan Hlinka tournament.
 August 7, 2008 — 53 players from 17 states were invited to the 2008 U.S. National Junior Evaluation Camp in Lake Placid, New York.
 August 16, 2008 — Canada's National Men's Summer Under-18 Team claimed first place at the 2008 Memorial of Ivan Hlinka tournament, with a 6–3 win over Russia.

 Regular season
 September 18, 2008 — a special tribute involving members of the Chynoweth family took place prior to the season opener between the Spokane Chiefs and Kootenay Ice.
 September 18, 2008 — the Spokane Chiefs were ranked as the top team in the league, according to the annual preseason rankings.
 September 19, 2008 — WHL Commissioner, Ron Robison, dedicated the 2008–09 season to Ed Chynoweth, who died on April 22, 2008.
 October 15, 2008 — The 2010 Memorial Cup was awarded to Brandon.
 January 3, 2009 — the Seattle Thunderbirds moved into their new arena, Showare Center, in Kent, Washington.
 January 14, 2009 — the 2009 CHL Top Prospects Game was held in Oshawa, Ontario.

 Playoffs
 March 20, 2009 — the start of the WHL Playoffs.

Regular season 
The Western Hockey League opened its 43rd regular season on September 18, 2008 in Cranbrook, British Columbia between defending Memorial Cup Champions, Spokane Chiefs and the Kootenay Ice. This season, the WHL is planning to have 30 of its regular season games broadcast on Shaw TV, as well as complete coverage of the 2009 WHL Playoffs. The broadcast schedule begun on September 18 with a special half-hour "preview show" followed by the 2008–09 WHL season opener.

The 2008–09 WHL season will also be highlighted with the Canada Russia Challenge, an annual CHL showcase event. The 2008 ADT Canada Russia Challenge, featured a two-game series between Team WHL versus the Russian Selects, on November 26, 2008 in Swift Current, Saskatchewan, and the second game took place on November 27, 2008 in Prince Albert, Saskatchewan.

Standings 
Note: GP = Games played, W = Wins, L = Losses, T = Ties, OTL = Overtime losses, Pts = Points, GF = Goals for, GA = Goals against, PIM = Penalties in minutes

 Eastern Conference

 Western Conference

 Conference standings

Scoring leaders 
Note: GP = Games played; G = Goals; A = Assists; Pts. = Points; PIM = Penalty minutes

Goaltending leaders 
Note: GP = Games played; Mins = Minutes played; W = Wins; L = Losses; OTL = Overtime losses; SOL = Shootout Losses; SO = Shutouts; GAA = Goals against average; Sv% = Save percentage 

* - Previously played for Saskatoon Blades.

Players

2008 NHL Entry Draft 
In total, 37 WHL players were selected at the 2008 NHL Entry Draft. This was more than any other hockey league in the world.

Contracts and scholarships 
 June 6, 2008 — Brett Martyniuk signs a WHL Players Contract with the Tri-City Americans.
 June 9, 2008 — Bretton Stamler agrees to play for the UNB Varsity Reds hockey club.

Trades

Canada Russia Challenge 
The ADT Canada Russia Challenge is a six-game series featuring four teams: three from the Canadian Hockey League (CHL) versus Russia's National Junior hockey team. Within the Canadian Hockey League umbrella, one team from each of its three leagues — the Ontario Hockey League, Quebec Major Junior Hockey League, and Western Hockey League — compete in two games against the Russian junior team.

The 2008 ADT Canada Russia Challenge was held in six cities across Canada, with two cities for each league within the Canadian Hockey League. The series begun on November 17, 2008, and concluded on November 27, 2008. Both Western Hockey League games were held in the province of Saskatchewan. Former Prince Albert Raider forward Dan Hodgson was Honorary Captain for the final game in the series, held in Prince Albert, Saskatchewan on November 27, 2008.

All six games were televised nationwide on Rogers Sportsnet, along with RDS broadcasting both games from the Quebec Major Junior Hockey League.

Results 
In the first game of the two part series between Team QMJHL and the Russian Selects, Team QMJHL scored five goals en route to a 5–3 win in front of 4,378 fans at Centre 200 in Sydney, Nova Scotia. Kmitri Kugryshev of the Russian Selects and goaltender Olivier Roy of Team QMJHL, were named the ADT Players of the Game for their respective teams. The Russian Selects evened the ADT Canada Russia Challenge, winning the second game after having registered four goals in a 4–3 victory in front of a sellout crowd of 6,451 assembled at Harbour Station in Saint John, New Brunswick.

2009 WHL Playoffs

Overview

Conference Quarter-finals

Eastern Conference

Western Conference

Conference Semi-finals

Conference Finals

WHL Championship

Memorial Cup 

The 91st MasterCard Memorial Cup was held in Rimouski, Quebec.

WHL awards 

Source WHL Announces 2008-09 Award Winners

All-Star Teams

 Source: WHL Announces 2008–09 Conference All-Star Teams and Award Finalists

See also 
 2009 Memorial Cup
 List of WHL seasons
 2008–09 OHL season
 2008–09 QMJHL season
 2008 NHL Entry Draft
 2008 in ice hockey
 2009 in ice hockey

References

Bibliography 
 Books

 2008–09 WHL Guide.

 Online

  Retrieved on 2008-10-06.

External links 

 Official website of the Western Hockey League
 Official website of the Canadian Hockey League
 Official website of the MasterCard Memorial Cup
 Official website of the Home Hardware Top Prospects Game
 Official website of the ADT Canada Russia Challenge

Western Hockey League seasons
WHL
WHL